Uncial 0107 (in the Gregory-Aland numbering), ε 41 (Soden), is a Greek uncial manuscript of the New Testament, dated paleographically to the 7th-century. Formerly it was labelled by Θb.

Description 

The codex contains a small part of the Matthew 22:16-23:14; Mark 4:24-35; 5:14-23, on six parchment leaves (27 cm by 21 cm). It is written in two columns per page, 23 lines per page, in uncial letters. It is hard to decipher. Itacistic errors are frequent. The text is divided according to the Ammonian Sections, with a references to the Eusebian Canons (in red).

The Greek text of this codex is mixed. Aland placed it in Category III.

History 

Currently it is dated by the INTF to the 7th-century.

The manuscript was brought by Tischendorf from the East in 1859, and edited its text in Notitia (1860).

The codex is located now at the Russian National Library (Gr. 11) in Saint Petersburg.

See also 

 List of New Testament uncials
 Textual criticism

References

Further reading 

 Constantin von Tischendorf, Notitia editionis codicis Bibliorum Sinaitici (Leipzig, 1860), p. 50. (brief description) 
 Kurt Treu, Die Griechischen Handschriften des Neuen Testaments in der USSR; eine systematische Auswertung des Texthandschriften in Leningrad, Moskau, Kiev, Odessa, Tbilisi und Erevan, T & U 91 (Berlin: 1966), pp. 27-28.

External links 

 Uncial 0107 at the Wieland Willker, "Textual Commentary"

Greek New Testament uncials
7th-century biblical manuscripts
National Library of Russia collection